Omar Metioui (Arabic: عمر المتيوي) (born 1962) is a Moroccan classical musician.

Metioui was born in Tangier and originally trained as a pharmacist, then concentrated on performance of the oud (Arabic: عود ʿūd), or Arabic lute, as well as performance as a vocalist. He has recorded with his own Ensemble Omar Metioui, and is cofounder in 1994 with Spanish musicologist, flautist and architect Eduardo Paniagua of the group Ibn Báya Ensemble, dedicated to the recovery of medieval Andalusian music. He also founded the group Al Ála Al-Andalusiyya ( الالـــة الانــدلـســيــة ) for performance of Andalusi nubah (نوبة أندلسيّة) and Arabo-Andalusian music.

Selected discography
 PN 150 Al Andalus – Al ala Al-Andalusiya  Metioui
 PN 200 Al Andalus – Misticismo - Musica Sufi Andalusi	Metioui
 PN 250 Al Andalus – Núba Al-Istihlal Metioui (was Sony)
 PN 360 Al Andalus – Ibn 'Arabi: El intérprete de los deseos (Arabic lyrics) Ens Ibn Bàya
 PN 430 Al Andalus – La Fuente del Amor Secreto  El Laúd en la Música Andalusí	Metioui
 PN 530 Al Andalus – ritual Sufi-Andalusi Al-Shushtarí (1212–1269) Metioui (Sony)
 PN 630 Al Andalus – Nuba Al-Maya (Arabic lyrics) Metioui
 PN 640 Al Andalus – Nuba rasd d-dayl. Cantos de la Noche (Arabic lyrics) Sony Metioui
 PN 650 Al Andalus – Sufies de Al-Andalus	Metioui
 PN --- Al Andalus – Canto Andalusí  Ibn Sahl de Sevilla 1212-1251 Metioui (Sony not yet rereleased PN)

References

1962 births
20th-century Moroccan musicians
21st-century Moroccan musicians
20th-century Moroccan male singers
21st-century Moroccan male singers
Living people
Lutenists
People from Tangier